is a Japanese football player.

Career
Chinen left FC Ryukyu at the end of 2018.

Club statistics
Updated to 20 February 2018.

References

External links
Profile at FC Ryukyu

1993 births
Living people
Ritsumeikan University alumni
Association football people from Okinawa Prefecture
Japanese footballers
J3 League players
FC Ryukyu players
Association football midfielders